"Used to Love You Sober" is a song recorded by American country music singer Kane Brown. It was first released on October 21, 2015 as his debut single, then re-released under the Sony / RCA Nashville label on February 16, 2016 after Brown was signed to the label. Brown co-wrote the song with Josh Hoge and Matt McVaney.

Background
In 2014, Brown began to post videos of his covers of songs by various country singers on social media where he gained a following. On September 30, 2015, he posted his cover of George Strait's "Check Yes or No" on Facebook, which went viral and received over seven million views. The number of his followers on Facebook reached over a million in a short time. Brown followed this up quickly on October 8, 2015 by releasing a clip of a teaser for his own single "Used to Love You Sober". The clip received one million views in under three hours, and reached over 11 million views two weeks later.
 
On October 21, 2015, on his birthday, the single "Used to Love You Sober" was released. The song was spotlighted on Zane Lowe's iTunes radio station Beats 1.

After Brown was signed to Sony / RCA Nashville in January 2016, the single was re-released as his first official single under the label on February 16, 2016.

Content
The song describes someone going through a breakup of a relationship, that the only way he can get love off his mind is by drinking, and that being drunk is the only way he doesn't feel like he's still in love.

Commercial performance
The song was released on the sixth day of the weekly chart tracking period, and based on just two days of sales, it debuted at number two on the Country Digital Songs chart, number seven on the Bubbling Under Hot 100 Singles chart, and number 22 on the Hot Country Songs chart, with 38,000 copies sold. The release of the single help pushed Brown's EP Closer up the chart to number 22 on the Top Album Sales chart. In its second week, it sold a further 46,000 copies, and it debuted on the US Billboard Hot 100 at number 82.

The song was re-released in February 2016 after Brown was signed to RCA Nashville, and entered the Country Airplay chart for the week of February 27, 2016 at number 58.  As of July 2016, the song has sold 314,000 downloads in the US.

Music videos
The first music video was directed by Clark Jackson and premiered in December 2015. A new video was released on March 18, 2016 after Brown was signed to RCA Nashville. The video was filmed at a show at Coyote Joe's in Charlotte, North Carolina, directed by David Poag.

Chart performance

Weekly charts

Year-end charts

Certifications

References

External links
 

2015 songs
2015 debut singles
Kane Brown songs
RCA Records Nashville singles
Songs about alcohol
Songs written by Kane Brown
Songs written by Josh Hoge